The Barney Flat Historic Railroad Logging Landscape is the historic remains of railroad logging on the South Kaibab Plateau in the early 20th century. Barney Flat is the only stump field on the US National Register of Historic Places. Barney Flat is located in the Kaibab National Forest, along the Perkinsville Road, south of Williams, Arizona. It was added to the National Register of Historic Places on February 24, 1995.

Railroad logging (1897–1936)
The Saginaw and Manistee logging company used temporary logging railroads to clearcut the South Kaibab
of ponderosa pines between 1897 and 1936. When the Williams mill ran out of timber in 1928,
operations turned north to the Tusayan Ranger District, south of Grand Canyon National Park. The Saginaw and Manistee used the Grand Canyon Railway line between 1928 and 1936. To access the timber stands loggers simply
laid ties and set down rail. As almost all rail was reused until it was worn out, then sold for scrap iron, only the wooden cross ties remain as evidence of this historic logging practice.

Barney Flat stump field
Many foresters believe that pre-settlement Southwestern ponderosa pine forests
contained 20–40 trees per acre. However, detailed mapping of the Barney Flat Stump Field counted 300 stumps in a  area. This is less than 10 trees per acre.

Historic logging railroad grades
Kaibab National Forest archaeologists have now mapped the locations and conditions of over 100
miles of logging railroad grades. These maps provide information about when and
how the forests were logged. Based on the condition of these historic features,
archaeologists determine their eligibility for the National Register of Historic Places.

Gallery

References

History of Coconino County, Arizona
National Register of Historic Places in Coconino County, Arizona